Clonia (Hemiclonia) is a subgenus of predatory katydids in the subfamily Saginae.

References

External links
 

Tettigoniidae
Insect subgenera